The Caspar C 17 was a mid-1920s German, low power, two seat ultralight aircraft with a cantilever wing of unusually high aspect ratio, flexibly attached to the fuselage to moderate gust effects.

Design and development

The chief aim of Ernst Ritter von Loessel, the C 17's designer, was to produce a light two-seater with just enough power to be useful as a touring, sports or training aircraft whilst being economical to fly. Fuel economy further was enhanced by its clean, low wing, cantilever monoplane layout.

Each wing had an unswept inner part with constant chord and a constant, thick section. The outer panels, which carried the ailerons, were slightly tapered in plan and strongly thinned outwards to angled tips. The aspect ratio  of 9.2 was high for the time, lowering the low speed induced drag. Each was built around two box section spars, longitudinally cross-braced with steel tubes and plywood-skinned. The most unusual feature was that the wing root mounting allowed spring-restrained variations of the angle of attack. The wings could pivot around a horizontal, span-wise axis just behind the forward spar, with a spring-loaded bolt at the rear spar. This was intended to make the lightweight C 17 less sensitive to gusts and also to exploit the Knoller-Betz effect by which some gust energy is converted into thrust and lift by a plunging wing. Von Loessel had earlier designed a glider incorporating flexible wings to use this effect but the C 17 developed the idea with an elevator-wing cross-connection to maintain trim.

The fuselage was based on a steel tube, rectangular section inner structure, covered by plywood fastened to stringers. Behind the engine there were two cockpits in tandem, one near the wing leading edge and the other just aft of the trailing edge. The empennage was unusual, as both horizontal and vertical surfaces were all-moving. Both were polygonal in plan, with the elevator mounted at mid-fuselage height and the rudder tall and narrow above it.

The axle was mounted on V-struts from the outer, lower tubes of the fuselage frame, one transversely to its centre and two longitudinal pairs to its ends.

The exact date of the C 17's first flight is not known but it was reported in November 1924 that the aircraft was completed "some while ago" and that it "flew quite well with its small British engine". Level flight could be maintained at an engine speed of 2,200 rpm which produced . Despite this, little more was heard about it and it was not one of the several Caspar aircraft to take part in the 1925 Round-Germany Flight.

Specifications

References

Caspar aircraft
1920s German sport aircraft
Low-wing aircraft
Aircraft first flown in 1924